The 1981 NCAA men's volleyball tournament was the 12th annual tournament to determine the national champion of NCAA men's collegiate volleyball. The tournament was played at the UC Santa Barbara Events Center in Santa Barbara, California during May 1981.

UCLA defeated USC in the final match, 3–2 (11–15, 15–7, 15–11, 8–15, 15–13), to win their eighth national title. This was a rematch of the previous two years' finals, which were split between UCLA and USC. The Bruins (32–3) were coached by Al Scates.

UCLA's Karch Kiraly was named Most Outstanding Player of the tournament. Kiraly, along with six other players, comprised the All-tournament team.

Qualification
Until the creation of the NCAA Men's Division III Volleyball Championship in 2012, there was only a single national championship for men's volleyball. As such, all NCAA men's volleyball programs (whether from Division I, Division II, or Division III) were eligible. A total of 4 teams were invited to contest this championship.

Tournament bracket 
Site: UC Santa Barbara Events Center, Santa Barbara, California

All tournament team 
Karch Kiraly, UCLA (Most outstanding player)
Steve Gulnac, UCLA
Steve Salmons, UCLA
Tim Hovland, USC
John Hedlund, USC
Bill Stetson, USC
Ahmet Ozacm, Penn State

See also 
 NCAA Men's National Collegiate Volleyball Championship

References

1981
NCAA Men's Volleyball Championship
NCAA Men's Volleyball Championship
Volleyball in California
1981 in sports in California
May 1981 sports events in the United States